The Wellmont Theater is a theater and concert venue located in Montclair, New Jersey, United States. The theater is located on the corner of Bloomfield Avenue and Seymour Street in downtown Montclair, near the border with neighboring Glen Ridge.

History
The theater opened in 1922 for live entertainment then switched to movies in 1929. In 2008 The Bowery Presents completed a $3 million renovation of the Wellmont Theater designed by architects Brian Swier and Michael Costantin. The building was retrofitted with new electrical and plumbing systems. New bars in the orchestra and mezzanine were installed. In 2013, venue booking changed to Live Nation, after the theater again underwent another careful refurbishment and started hosting major acts like Steely Dan, B.B. King, Cheap Trick, Fetty Wap, Ms. Lauryn Hill, and DNCE.

The Wellmont is a venue for the annual Montclair Film Festival.

References

External links
 http://www.thewellmont.com

Montclair, New Jersey
Theatres in New Jersey
Music venues in New Jersey
1922 establishments in New Jersey
Buildings and structures in Essex County, New Jersey
Tourist attractions in Essex County, New Jersey